The II CELAC summit or 2014 CELAC summit was the second ordinary heads of state summit of the Community of Latin American and Caribbean States. It was held on 28 and 29 January 2014 in Havana, Cuba.

The plenary session was opened by Secretary-General of the United Nations Ban Ki-moon.

References

External links 
 
 Official declaration (Spanish)

2014 conferences
2014 in international relations
2014 in South America
2014 in the Caribbean
Diplomatic conferences in Cuba
Summit,2014